Legend of Fuyao is a 2018 Chinese television series based on the novel Empress Fuyao by Tianxia Guiyuan. It stars Yang Mi and Ethan Juan. The series aired on Zhejiang TV from June 18 to August 13, 2018.

Synopsis
The story takes place in the universe of Five Kingdoms that is led by the Imperial City of Tianquan. Fuyao was formed from a lotus borne by the Ancient firmament. Adopted as an orphan, she served as a slave for the Xuanyuan sect from the Taiyuan Kingdom. A series of tragedies resulted in a journey across the land to gather the magical artifacts that could lift the curse that blighted her life. Along the way, she met the Crown Prince of Tianquan who was masquerading as the heir of Taiyuan while conducting secret missions to quell unrest in the Five Kingdoms. The pair fell in love as they battled the complicated politics and power plays between the different forces. With the help of her loyal companions, Fuyao set out to unravel the heinous plot of the ancient firmament. She discovered her real identity as the "Lotus Princess" and succeeded in destroying the evil forces, bringing peace to the land of Five Kingdoms.

Cast

Main

Supporting

Taiyuan kingdom

Tianquan kingdom

Tiansha kingdom

Xuanji kingdom

Ancient Firmament

Production

Casting and filming
During Linmon Picture's annual television production showcase in February 2017, Yang Mi was announced to be the female lead for upcoming project Legend of Fuyao. Fuyao was said to contain eastern elements of fantasy, with its plot containing exciting political maneuvers and modern values of relationship.

In June 2017, Ethan Juan was announced to play the male lead. Both Juan and Yang announced their roles through their respective Weibo account. Major supporting cast members were unveiled through picture stills in July 2017.

The series began filming on 27 June 2017 in Hengdian World Studios, and wrapped up on November 24, 2017.

Crew
The series is produced by Linmon Pictures and directed by Magnolia Award-winner Yang Wenjun (Divorce Lawyers). Other notable cast members include martial arts choreographer Li Cai (Hero, House of Flying Daggers), art director Shao Changyong (Nirvana in Fire, The Disguiser) and two-time Golden Horse Award winner Stanley Cheung as its costume designer.

Location
The series is primarily filmed in Hengdian World Studios as well as Yinchuan. Numerous sets were built in a piece of barren land of up to 60,000 square meters.

Soundtrack

Reception
Fuyao was praised by CCTV media for transmitting positive values and messages such as persistence, independence and magnanimity; as well as encouraging people to chase after their dreams. However, audience response has not been positive; the series was criticized for having cliché plots and a "Mary Sue" protagonist; as well as very similar storylines to Harry Potter and the Goblet of Fire.

Despite divided reviews, the series' popularity remains high domestically with high online views; as well as acclaim from overseas fans. In particular, the series was highly praised in the Daily Pakistan newspaper, with the media outlet calling the show "a wonderful presentation of Chinese characteristics" and praising its cinematography. It gained 14 billion views in 50 days, becoming the most viewed online drama of the summer season.

Ratings

Note: Part of the series is broadcast online on Tencent Video before airing on Zhejiang TV. VIP members of Tencent are four episodes ahead of non-VIP members and regular television broadcast.

Awards and nominations

References

External links

Chinese fantasy television series
Television shows based on Chinese novels
2018 Chinese television series debuts
Television series by Linmon Pictures
Television series by Tencent Penguin Pictures
2018 Chinese television series endings